The 1941 Indiana Hoosiers football team was an American football team that represented Indiana University in the 1941 Big Ten Conference football season. In their eighth season under head coach Bo McMillin, the Hoosiers compiled a 2–6 record (1–3 against conference opponents) and were outscored by a total of 126 to 101. The team played its home games at Memorial Stadium in Bloomington, Indiana.

Schedule

1942 NFL draftees

References

Indiana
Indiana Hoosiers football seasons
Indiana Hoosiers football